MGP of Indiana (Midwest Grain Products of Indiana), formerly known as LDI (Lawrenceburg Distillers Indiana), is a distillery in Lawrenceburg, Indiana, producing spirits for private label sale.  These are sold under about 50 different brand names by various bottling companies, with a recent addition of their own products, Till Vodka, George Remus Bourbon, and Rossville Union Straight Rye Whiskey. The facility's largest customer is the London-based multinational beverage giant Diageo.

History
The distillery was founded in 1847 and purchased by Seagram in 1933. While under their ownership, the distillery was called the Jos. E. Seagram Lawrenceburg Plant. When Seagram's assets were acquired by other companies, the Lawrenceburg distillery became the property of Pernod Ricard.

On April 19, 2006, Pernod Ricard announced plans to close the distillery, but instead sold it in 2007 to CL Financial, a holding company based in Trinidad and Tobago, which renamed it "Lawrenceburg Distillers Indiana" (LDI). CL Financial later collapsed and required government intervention, although the facility continued to operate through the company crisis.

In October 2011, MGP Ingredients announced that it had reached an agreement to purchase the distillery, giving it its present name. , Diageo is the distillery's biggest customer.

Products
MGP of Indiana has seven whiskey brands of its own as of April 2021, including George Remus bourbon and Rossville Union, but primarily sells its output to various bottlers. One primary product of MGP Indiana is a straight rye whiskey with a 95% rye mash bill, which is bottled under various brand names, including Angel's Envy, Bulleit Rye, Filibuster, George Dickel Rye, James E. Pepper, Smooth Ambler, and Templeton Rye. It also produces straight Bourbon whiskey, which is sold under various brand names, such as the Cougar Bourbon brand sold in Australia. These straight whiskeys are also used as the straight whiskey components in Seagram's Seven Crown, a blended whiskey now produced by Diageo, and High West. The distillery also produces neutral spirits used in the production of Seagram-branded gin and vodka, now owned by Pernod Ricard.

In April 2013, MGP announced the introduction of six additional mash bills for rye, malt, wheat and bourbon whiskey to expand the range of product offerings for the Indiana facility.

Altogether, MGP is the source of beverage spirits sold under about 50 different brand names, although these are often sold misleadingly by their bottlers as distinctive products with minimal disclosure of the actual source of the spirits. Some industry experts have commented negatively about the practice, such as the whiskey writer Charles Cowdery who has decried such bottlers as "Potemkin distilleries". As one example, in a class action settlement announced in 2015 about the marketing of the Templeton Rye brand which was actually produced using MGP spirits, Templeton was required to add the words "distilled in Indiana" to its label and remove claims of using a "Prohibition Era Recipe" and "small batch" production. The settlement also offered refunds to customers who had bought Templeton Rye since 2006.

Some brands modify the facility's products somewhat before bottling and selling them. George Dickel Rye, introduced in 2012, is mashed, distilled and aged in Indiana at MGP, and then trucked to the Diageo bottling plant in Plainfield, Illinois for filtering and bottling. Angel's Envy finishes its spirits in old port wine casks before bottling.

MGP also produces plant-based protein. In 2021, MGP was ranked 31st on FoodTalks's Global Top Plant Protein Companies list.

References

External links 
 MGP website

Companies listed on the Nasdaq
Distilleries in Indiana
Dearborn County, Indiana
1847 establishments in Indiana
Food and drink companies established in 1847
1933 mergers and acquisitions
2007 mergers and acquisitions
2011 mergers and acquisitions